The Centre for Public Integrity is an Australian non-profit public policy think tank. The Centre for Public Integrity advocates against corruption, and for reining in executive power and changes to Australia's political finance system. The Centre collaborates with academics, legal practitioners and retired judges to conduct research on integrity reform in Australia.

Research focus 

The Centre for Public Integrity's research agenda focusses on accountability institutions, the use of executive power in the Australian Government, Australia's political finance system, the establishment of a national integrity commission, and pork barrelling.

Governance 

The Centre's Board of Directors is chaired by former New South Wales Court of Appeal judge Anthony Whealy. Current members of the Board include George Williams (lawyer), Stephen Charles, Gabrielle Appelby, Joo Cheong Tham and Geoffrey Watson SC.

References 

Think tanks based in Australia
Anti-corruption agencies in Australia
Organisations based in Melbourne
Political funding
2019 establishments in Australia